Christian Tyler Shatley (born May 5, 1991) is an American football guard for the Jacksonville Jaguars of the National Football League (NFL). He was signed as an undrafted free agent by the Jaguars after the 2014 NFL Draft. He played college football at Clemson where he graduated with a degree in Civil Engineering.

Professional career

Following the 2014 NFL Draft, Shatley was signed by the Jacksonville Jaguars as an undrafted free agent. He made the team's 53-man roster on August 30, 2014.

On February 21, 2017, Shatley signed a one-year extension with the Jaguars. He played in all 16 games in 2017, starting four at center and right guard due to injuries.

In 2018, Shatley started seven games at center following a season-ending injury to Brandon Linder.

On March 29, 2019, Shatley re-signed with the Jaguars. On March 27, 2020, Shatley re-signed with the Jaguars. He re-signed with the team again on March 15, 2021.

On February 28, 2022, Shatley signed a two-year contract extension with the Jaguars.

References

External links
Jacksonville Jaguars bio
Clemson Tigers bio

1991 births
Living people
People from Valdese, North Carolina
Players of American football from North Carolina
American football offensive guards
Clemson Tigers football players
Jacksonville Jaguars players